Nagórnik  is a village in the administrative district of Gmina Sieciechów, within Kozienice County, Masovian Voivodeship, in east-central Poland.

It lies on the voivodeships road .

See also 
Nagórnik - Lower Silesian Voivodeship

References

External links
 
 

Villages in Kozienice County